Lorestan University of Medical Sciences is a public university in Khorramabad, Iran. The University has six faculties in its campus including medicine, dentistry, pharmacy, health care, nursing, paramedicine and four satellite schools in Borujerd, Aligudarz, Pol-e Dokhtar, and Dorud.

References

External links
 "Official Website of the Lorestan University of Medical Sciences"

Lorestan, University of Medical Sciences
Lorestan, University of Medical Sciences
Education in Lorestan Province
Buildings and structures in Lorestan Province
1986 establishments in Iran